Kadhi chawal ("curd curry with rice") is a popular dish originating from South Asia. Kadhi is prepared by mixing Curd, Besan (Chickpea Flour) and different spices. It is served with boiled rice and is very popular in Northern and Western States of India. It usually has a thick consistency and contains fritters (Pakora). Kadhi in Gujarat & Maharashtra is savoury & sometimes do not have any fritters. Fritters for Kadhi also have several varieties, they are prepared with onions, potato, spinach, etc.

References

Pakistani cuisine
Pakistani rice dishes